The North County Trailway is a  long paved rail trail stretching from Eastview to Baldwin Place in Westchester County, New York. It is also part of the statewide Empire State Trail.

History and route
The North County Trailway was constructed along the Putnam Division railbed of the former New York Central Railroad ("Old Put").  At its north end it becomes the Putnam County Trailway, which continues along the former railbed to Brewster, New York.

It connects to the South County Trailway in Eastview, also built along the former railroad. It connects through the Eastview parking lot to the Tarrytown Lakes Extension and Tarrytown Lakes Trail to the Old Croton Aqueduct and Tarrytown.

While primarily a dedicated multi-use path, trail users are directed by signs to use a highway shoulder for two sections between Briarcliff Manor and Millwood.

The Putnam Division provided passenger service from 1881 to 1958 between the Bronx and Putnam County, with freight service continuing until 1962. The railroad served 23 stations in Westchester County. Historic marker plaques have been placed at most of the former stations.

In 2019, County Executive George Latimer announced that $8.7 million would be dedicated to improving the trailway. The project is expected to be done in 2020.

See also
 List of rail trails in New York

References

External links 
 
  
 
 
 

Protected areas of Westchester County, New York